Panamá Sporting Club is an Ecuadorian football club based in Guayaquil. Founded in 1923, it plays in the Segunda Categoría. The club is named after the Panama Canal.

Honors
Regional
Guayaquil Championship (3):1938, 1939, 1941
National
Serie B (1): 1997

References

Football clubs in Ecuador
Association football clubs established in 1923
1923 establishments in Ecuador